is a Shingon-sect Buddhist temple in the city of Obama, Fukui Prefecture, Japan.

History
The foundation of Myōtsū-ji is uncertain. Per temple records dated 1374, the temple was founded by the famous general Sakanoue no Tamuramaro in 806. Two of the structures of the temple date to the 
Kamakura period: the Hondō and the three-storey pagoda and both are designated National Treasures. A number of Heian-period statues within these buildings are designated Important Cultural Properties. The temple also has a garden with a pond.

Buildings
 Hondō (1258) (NT), also referred to as the  has a floor plan of 14.09 m × 14.82 m. The building has a hipped roof with a distinctive roof beam and is covered with cypress bark shingles (檜 皮 葺, Hiwada-buki). It was restored in 1923.
 Three-storey pagoda (1270) (NT), with a total height of 22.13 meters is also covered with cypress bark shingles. It was restored in 1958.
 Sanmon (1772) is an Obama City Cultural Property (C.ICP), and contains statues of the Kongōrikishi which are dated 1264, and which are also Obama C.ICPs.
 Shōrō

Treasures
 Seated wooden statue of Yakushi Nyorai (Heian period) (Important Cultural Property), Gohonzon
 Standing wooden statue of Gōzanze Myōō (Heian period) (ICP)
 Standing wooden statue of Fudō Myōō (Heian period) (ICP)
 Standing wooden statue of Jinja Daishō (Heian period) (ICP)
 Kenponchakushoku Hikohohodemi-no-mikoto emaki, 6 scrolls (Edo period) (Prefectural Cultural Property)
 399 donor plaques dating from 1309 to 1694 (Prefectural Cultural Property)

See also
 List of National Treasures of Japan (temples)

References

External links

  

Buddhist temples in Fukui Prefecture
National Treasures of Japan
9th-century establishments in Japan
Obama, Fukui